Benjamin Paul Joppru (born January 5, 1980) is a former American football tight end. He was selected by the Houston Texans in the second round of the 2003 NFL Draft out of the University of Michigan. In addition to the Texans, he has played for the Seattle Seahawks in his career.

College career
In 2002, during his senior season at Michigan, Joppru caught 53 passes, setting single season school record for tight ends. For his efforts, he was named to the Associated Press All-America Third-team. In his career at Michigan, Joppru had 85 receptions for 800 yards and eight touchdowns.

Professional career

The Chicago Bears signed Joppru to their practice squad on October 10, 2006, after the Texans cut him with the intent to sign him to their practice squad.  However, in November 2006, the Seattle Seahawks signed Joppru off of the Bears' practice squad.

Personal life
Joppru's father, Sheldon played in the World Football League for the Shreveport Steamer and the Detroit Wheels. His brother, J. J., played defensive line at Fullerton College before going to the University of Arizona. Another brother, Chris, was the starting tight end for the undefeated 2008 Utah Utes football team.

See also
Lists of Michigan Wolverines football receiving leaders

References

External links

1980 births
Living people
People from Dickinson, North Dakota
American football tight ends
Chicago Bears players
Houston Texans players
Seattle Seahawks players
Michigan Wolverines football players
Players of American football from Minnesota